Kevin Allan Jurovich (born June 30, 1986) is a former American football wide receiver. He signed as an undrafted free agent with the Philadelphia Eagles in 2010. He played college football at San Jose State University.

Jurovich was also member of the San Francisco 49ers and Chicago Bears.

Early years
A native of Santa Clara, California, Jurovich graduated from Valley Christian High School in San Jose, California. He started at quarterback, free safety and punt returner his senior year in high school. The 2003 Valley Christian Warriors won the CCS title. That year, he combined for 19 touchdowns while averaging 23.8 yards per punt return. Jurovich was named 1st team all-ccs by the Mercury News.

College career
From 2004 to 2009, Jurovich played for the San Jose State Spartans football team. He majored in communications.

After redshirting his freshman season in 2004, Jurovich debuted in 2005 as a safety, holding the ball for kick-scoring attempts. As a redshirt sophomore in 2006, during his team's run to the 2006 New Mexico Bowl, Jurovich left the team in October due to a hand injury, among other reasons. Jurovich returned to the team in 2007 as a wide receiver.

In 2007, he broke San Jose States record for receptions in a season, he finished the season with 85 receptions for 1183 yards and 9 touchdowns.

Jurovich finished his career as San Jose State's all time leader in receptions (160) and fourth in receiving yards(2,143).

Professional career

Philadelphia Eagles
On April 26, 2010, Jurovich signed as an undrafted free agent to the Philadelphia Eagles, but he was released on July 29.

San Francisco 49ers
The San Francisco 49ers signed Jurovich to a two-year contract on August 8, 2010. Jurovich was on the 49ers practice squad for the 2010 season. Kevin Lynch, writing for SFGate.com, commented that Jurovich "has some kickoff return ability and never drops a pass." The 49ers cut Jurovich on September 3, placed him on practice squad two days later, and signed him again on January 5, 2011. He was released by the 49ers on August 30, 2011.

The Chicago Bears signed Jurovich to the practice squad on December 21, 2011.

References

External links
San Jose State Spartans biography

1986 births
Living people
Players of American football from San Jose, California
American football wide receivers
Sportspeople from Santa Clara, California
San Jose State Spartans football players
Chicago Bears players
Philadelphia Eagles players
San Francisco 49ers players